Pollmann is a surname. Notable people with the surname include:

Erika Pollmann (born 1944), German sprinter
Karla Pollmann (born 1963), German classical scholar
Tim Pollmann (born 1990), German footballer

See also
Pellmann